Oceans is an eight-part documentary series on BBC Two, which seeks to provide a better understanding of the state of the Earth's oceans today, their role in the past, present and future and their significance in global terms. Paul Rose also documents some of the scientific observations his team made as a feature for BBC News.

Species Featured
Some of the species features in the series include: Sperm whale, Humboldt squid, Sea lion, Scallop, Hammerhead shark, Kelp, Weedy sea dragon, Maori octopus, Fur seal, Rock lobster, Lionfish, Coconut crab, Seahorses, Whale shark, Dugong, Six gill shark, Great white shark, Tuna, Walrus and Beluga whale.

Episodes/Locations
There are eight episodes in the series.

 1: Sea of Cortez - First broadcast 12 November 2008
The marine experts carry out pioneering science on the 20-metre-long sperm whale.

2: Southern Ocean - First broadcast 19 November 2008
Why are parts of the Southern Ocean warming twice as fast as the rest of Earth's oceans?

3: Red Sea - First broadcast 26 November 2008
The team explores the remote and unexplored Southern Red Sea.

4: Atlantic Ocean - First broadcast 27 November 2008
The team explores a corner of the Atlantic Ocean.

5: Indian Ocean - First broadcast 3 December 2008
The team explores the tropics of the Indian Ocean and search for the elusive dugong.

6: Indian Ocean - Coastal waters - First broadcast 4 December 2008
The team explores the coastal waters of the Indian Ocean.

7: Mediterranean Sea - First broadcast 10 December 2008
An exploration of the profound effect that man is having on the Mediterranean Sea.

8: Arctic Ocean - First broadcast 19 December 2008
The team dive beneath the polar ice cap to explore how the ice is shrinking.

Crew
Paul Rose - Polar explorer, expedition leader
Tooni Mahto - Marine biologist, oceanographer
Lucy Blue - Marine archaeologist
Philippe Cousteau - Environmentalist, oceanographer

Related links

2008 British television series debuts
2008 British television series endings
2000s British documentary television series
BBC television documentaries
BBC high definition shows
English-language television shows
Documentary films about nature